The 1916 Massachusetts Aggies football team represented Massachusetts Agricultural College in the 1916 college football season. The team was coached by George Melican and played its home games at Alumni Field in Amherst, Massachusetts. The 1916 season was Melican's only as head coach of the Aggies and the team's last season before disbanding during World War I. Massachusetts finished the season with a record of 2–4–2.

Schedule

References

Massachusetts
UMass Minutemen football seasons
Massachusetts Aggies football